Nathaniel Fitch Sr. (born October 31, 1956) is an American former heavyweight boxer best known for his stellar amateur boxing career.

Early years
"Years ago I was at a Boys Club and some guys took my bike and my brothers went to retrieve it and I'll just say I was impressed with the way they did it," said Fitch. "From that point forward I knew I wanted to learn to box."

In 1977, Fitch enlisted in the U.S. Army where he began his career as an amateur boxer. He transferred to Fort Bragg in 1983.

Amateur career
Fitch went on to win the 1983 All-Army Championship, the 1983 Interservice Championship, the 1984 Olympic Sports Festival, the 1985 National Amateur Boxing Federation Championship, the 1987 National Golden Gloves Championship and the 1987 Eastern Olympic Trials.

Accomplishments
 1983 All-Army Champion (+201 lbs)
 1983 Interservice Champion
 1984 U.S. Olympic Festival Winner (+201 lbs)
 1985 United States (AAU) Amateur Champion (+201 lbs)
 1987 National Golden Gloves Super Heavyweight Champion (+201 lbs)
1987 Eastern Olympic Trials: Qualified (+201 lbs)
1988 National Olympic Trials: in quarterfinals lost to Riddick Bowe by unanimous decision, 5–0
He finished his amateur career with a record of 187 wins, 16 losses and 1 draw.

Professional career
Fitch turned pro in 1988 and had limited success. His resume included losses to notable heavyweights Lou Savarese, Tim Witherspoon, Bruce Seldon, Jeremy Williams, Chris Byrd, and John Ruiz. He retired in 1997 after a decision loss to Timo Hoffmann.

Professional boxing record

|-
|align="center" colspan=8|12 Wins (8 knockouts, 4 decisions), 19 Losses (10 knockouts, 9 decisions), 1 No Contest 
|-
| align="center" style="border-style: none none solid solid; background: #e3e3e3"|Result
| align="center" style="border-style: none none solid solid; background: #e3e3e3"|Record
| align="center" style="border-style: none none solid solid; background: #e3e3e3"|Opponent
| align="center" style="border-style: none none solid solid; background: #e3e3e3"|Type
| align="center" style="border-style: none none solid solid; background: #e3e3e3"|Round
| align="center" style="border-style: none none solid solid; background: #e3e3e3"|Date
| align="center" style="border-style: none none solid solid; background: #e3e3e3"|Location
| align="center" style="border-style: none none solid solid; background: #e3e3e3"|Notes
|-align=center
|Loss
|
|align=left| Timo Hoffmann
|PTS
|6
|05/10/1997
|align=left| Gera, Germany
|align=left|
|-
|Loss
|
|align=left| Najee Shaheed
|TKO
|5
|23/01/1997
|align=left| Boston, Massachusetts, U.S.
|align=left|
|-
|Loss
|
|align=left| Terrence Lewis
|KO
|4
|06/12/1996
|align=left| Philadelphia, Pennsylvania, U.S.
|align=left|
|-
|Loss
|
|align=left| John Ruiz
|TKO
|3
|25/10/1996
|align=left| Boston, Massachusetts, U.S.
|align=left|
|-
|Loss
|
|align=left| Richie Melito
|TKO
|1
|17/07/1996
|align=left| New York City, New York U.S.
|align=left|
|-
|Win
|
|align=left| Steve West
|TKO
|2
|06/04/1996
|align=left| Fayetteville, North Carolina, U.S.
|align=left|
|-
|Loss
|
|align=left| Don Steele
|TKO
|5
|19/12/1995
|align=left| Columbia, South Carolina, U.S.
|align=left|
|-
|Loss
|
|align=left| Chris Byrd
|KO
|7
|03/10/1995
|align=left| Flint, Michigan, U.S.
|align=left|
|-
|Win
|
|align=left| Larry Donnell
|TKO
|1
|27/09/1995
|align=left| Raleigh, North Carolina, U.S.
|align=left|
|-
|Loss
|
|align=left| Boone Pultz
|UD
|8
|14/09/1995
|align=left| Greenbelt, Maryland, U.S.
|align=left|
|-
|Loss
|
|align=left| Kirk Johnson
|PTS
|10
|07/07/1995
|align=left| Bossier City, Louisiana, U.S.
|align=left|
|-
|Loss
|
|align=left| Sam Hampton
|PTS
|8
|11/04/1995
|align=left| Woodlawn, Maryland, U.S.
|align=left|
|-
|Loss
|
|align=left| Zeljko Mavrovic
|KO
|1
|11/02/1995
|align=left| Frankfurt, Germany
|align=left|
|-
|Loss
|
|align=left| Tim Witherspoon
|TKO
|6
|17/12/1994
|align=left| Atlantic City, New Jersey, U.S.
|align=left|
|-
|No Contest
|
|align=left| Stanley Wright
|NC
|2
|20/07/1994
|align=left| Raleigh, North Carolina, U.S.
|align=left|
|-
|Loss
|
|align=left| Bruce Seldon
|TKO
|4
|19/02/1994
|align=left| Charlotte, North Carolina, U.S.
|align=left|
|-
|Loss
|
|align=left| Jeremy Williams
|RTD
|7
|09/11/1993
|align=left| Fargo, North Dakota, U.S.
|align=left|
|-
|Loss
|
|align=left| Lou Savarese
|UD
|10
|17/04/1993
|align=left| Bushkill, Pennsylvania, U.S.
|align=left|
|-
|Loss
|
|align=left| Levi Billups
|UD
|10
|25/01/1993
|align=left| Inglewood, California, U.S.
|align=left|
|-
|Win
|
|align=left| Ricky Parkey
|TKO
|5
|24/10/1992
|align=left| Charleston, South Carolina, U.S.
|align=left|
|-
|Win
|
|align=left| Mike Cohen
|PTS
|8
|26/06/1992
|align=left| Jacksonville, Florida, U.S.
|align=left|
|-
|Win
|
|align=left| Danny Wofford
|PTS
|4
|20/05/1992
|align=left| Concord, North Carolina, U.S.
|align=left|
|-
|Win
|
|align=left| Frankie Hines
|TKO
|1
|24/04/1992
|align=left| Raleigh, North Carolina, U.S.
|align=left|
|-
|Loss
|
|align=left| Everett Mayo
|UD
|10
|27/02/1992
|align=left| Virginia Beach, Virginia, U.S.
|align=left|
|-
|Loss
|
|align=left| Jerry Jones
|SD
|8
|06/02/1992
|align=left| Glen Burnie, Maryland, U.S.
|align=left|
|-
|Win
|
|align=left| Terry Davis
|KO
|1
|12/11/1991
|align=left| Jacksonville, Florida, U.S.
|align=left|
|-
|Win
|
|align=left| Fred Adams
|UD
|6
|18/10/1991
|align=left| Tampa, Florida, U.S.
|align=left|
|-
|Win
|
|align=left| Charlie Harris
|KO
|2
|03/08/1991
|align=left| Pensacola, Florida, U.S.
|align=left|
|-
|Win
|
|align=left| Sonny Crooms
|TKO
|2
|28/04/1991
|align=left| Raleigh, North Carolina, U.S.
|align=left|
|-
|Win
|
|align=left| Charles Dixon
|KO
|2
|15/02/1991
|align=left| Dothan, Alabama, U.S.
|align=left|
|-
|Win
|
|align=left| Lynwood Barry
|DQ
|2
|18/11/1990
|align=left| Portsmouth, Virginia, U.S.
|align=left|
|-
|Loss
|
|align=left| Fred Whitaker
|PTS
|4
|16/09/1988
|align=left| Winston-Salem, North Carolina, U.S.
|align=left|
|}

Retirement and later life
Upon retirement Fitch became a boxing coach at Fitch's Boxing Club in Spring Lake, North Carolina.

He was also inducted into the North Carolina Boxing Hall Fame.

References

External links
 

1958 births
Living people
Boxers from North Carolina
Heavyweight boxers
National Golden Gloves champions
People from Spring Lake, North Carolina
American male boxers